Chan Kong Wah (born 31 August 1961 in Guangdong) is a Hong Kong table tennis player who played at the 1996 Summer Olympics.

He is married to former teammate Mok Ka Sha, who like him went to Hong Kong in the 1980s.

References

External links
 

Hong Kong male table tennis players
Olympic table tennis players of Hong Kong
Table tennis players at the 1996 Summer Olympics
Living people
1961 births
Table tennis players from Guangdong
Table tennis players at the 1986 Asian Games
Table tennis players at the 1990 Asian Games
Table tennis players at the 1994 Asian Games
Asian Games competitors for Hong Kong